Andrea Galante (born September 2, 1982) is an Argentine actress, primarily in television and film.

Early life and education
Galante was born in Buenos Aires. She graduated from the Argentine National Institute of Cinematic Arts (ENERC).

Career
Galante usually appears in romantic dramas. She has appeared on-stage in Espumantes and two segments of La noticia del día. She made her on-screen debut in 1995 as a child actress in the telenovela , as María Sol.

Her film début was in Chiche bombón (2004), as a failed pregnant actress; she has since appeared in the shorts Esas noches de insomnio (2005) and Aminga, de un pueblo à la ciudad (2007), and Paco (2009). She starred in Cuando ella saltó (2007) opposite Argentine model and actor Iván de Pineda. She also co-stars in Claudio Bertel's upcoming Engaño.

Filmography

Amigovios (1995) TV series as María Sol
Franco Buenaventura, el profe (2002) TV series as Paula Libonati
El Deseo (2004) TV series as Coral
Chiche bombón (2004) as Chiche
Esas noches de insomnio as (2005) as Violeta
Hombres de honor (2005) TV series as Bella de Brusca
mujeres asesinas (2006) TV series
Aminga, de un pueblo à la ciudad (2007)
Cuando ella saltó (2007) as Angela/Lila
Miss Argentina (2008)
Paco (pre-production)
Engaño (pre-production) as Bernabela

References

External links
 

Argentine television actresses
Argentine film actresses
1982 births
People from Buenos Aires
Living people